The 1962 Eastern Michigan Hurons football team represented Eastern Michigan University as an independent during the 1962 NCAA College Division football season. In their 11th season under head coach Fred Trosko, the Hurons compiled a 2–5 record and were outscored by their opponents, 90 to 75. The team's two victories were against Eastern Illinois University and Alma College.  Al Vadasay and Leroy Fahle were the team captains.

Schedule

See also
 1962 in Michigan

References

Eastern Michigan
Eastern Michigan Eagles football seasons
Eastern Michigan Hurons football